Jaroslav Bureš (born 5 May 1954) is a Czech lawyer, politician, former Minister of Justice and presidential candidate in 2003. He is a judge at a High court in Prague.

Biography
Bureš was born in Mimoň. He graduated at Charles University in 1979 and received a law degree. He became a judge at Regional court in Prague and in 1991 he became part of Supreme Court of the Czech Republic.

He was a minister of Justice in 2001-2002. He participated in 2003 presidential election as nominee of Czech Social Democratic Party. He participated in party's primaries but came second. He was allowed to participate in the first ballot but was eliminated in the first round.

References

1954 births
Living people
People from Mimoň
20th-century Czech judges
Supreme Court of the Czech Republic judges
Charles University alumni
Justice ministers of the Czech Republic
Candidates in the 2003 Czech presidential election
Czech Social Democratic Party presidential candidates
Czech Social Democratic Party Government ministers
Czechoslovak judges